Kowlian (Also spelled as Kaolian and Kawlyan) is a village in Afghanistan. It has been the site of factional fighting. It is in Faryab Province.

References

See also
List of places in Afghanistan

Populated places in Faryab Province